Glumac is a surname. Notable people with the surname include:

Mike Glumac (born 1980), Canadian ice hockey player 
Rick Glumac, Canadian software engineer and politician
Tomislav Glumac (born 1991), Croatian footballer

See also
 Glumač, a village in Serbia